Agus may refer to:

People
Agus (footballer) (born 1985), Spanish footballer
Agus Salim, 3rd Foreign Minister of Indonesia
Agus Suhartono, Indonesian admiral
Agus Harimurti Yudhoyono, a Major in the Indonesian Army
Agus R. Sarjono, Indonesian Writer
Agus Martowardojo, Indonesian politician
David Agus (born 1965), American physician
Gianni Agus, Italian actor
Zaharah Agus, Malaysian singer

Other uses
 Agus means "and" in Irish, and the et ("and") symbol in the Tironian notes shorthand system, known as agus in Irish
Agus River, in the Philippines

Pak Agus was the dictator of Agusland from April 3rd 1969 - March 19th 1975